Sophiatown is a 2003 documentary film. Sophiatown in the 1950s was a suburb of Johannesburg South Africa where all races mixed in defiance of apartheid. Sophiatown was famous for jazz and black gangsters heavily influenced by American film who spoke a slang called Tsotsitaal.

This era is revisited by some of the artists who lived there and they call back the past in two concerts.

External links 
 
 

Apartheid films
2003 films
Irish documentary films
South African documentary films
Afrikaans-language films
Films shot in South Africa
2000s English-language films